Jafre is a village in Girona, within the Autonomous Community of Catalonia, Spain.

References

External links
 Government data pages 

Municipalities in Baix Empordà
Populated places in Baix Empordà